David Nixon may refer to:

David Nixon (magician) (1919–1978), English magician and television personality
David Nixon (choreographer), Canadian dance choreographer
David Nixon (footballer) (born 1988), Scottish footballer
David Nixon (director), American film director and producer
David Nixon (American football) (born 1985), American football linebacker